Suleman Huda (born 14 July 1975) is a Pakistani former cricketer. He played in 20 first-class and 26 List A matches between 1996 and 2001. He was also part of Pakistan's squad for the cricket tournament at the 1998 Commonwealth Games.

References

External links
 

1975 births
Living people
Cricketers at the 1998 Commonwealth Games
Pakistani cricketers
Karachi cricketers
Place of birth missing (living people)
Commonwealth Games competitors for Pakistan